Pedro Henrique Konzen Medina da Silva (born 16 June 1990), commonly referred to as Pedro Henrique, is a Brazilian professional footballer who plays as a winger for Campeonato Brasileiro Série A club Internacional.

Career
Born on June 16, 1990, in Santa Cruz do Sul, Pedro Henrique Konzen Medina da Silva is trained at Santa Cruz then Avaí and Grêmio .

In 2010, he left Grêmio to return to Santa Cruz do Sul, where he joined the ranks of Avenida. He made his debut in the Campeonato Gaúcho, playing two matches as a substitute. However, he is quickly recruited by the Caxias, with whom he discovers the C-series, obtains his first titles, and scores his first professional goals: during the 2011 season, he plays a total of 24 games and scores three goals. The first on 19 January 2011 against Esporte Clube Pelotas. Pedro Henrique played with the SER Caxias until January 2012. On that date, he left Brazil to join Europe. Spotted by FC Zürich, he signed a contract with the Swiss club on January 24, 2012. During his first half season in the Swiss championship, Pedro Henrique plays fifteen games. He scored his first and only goal of the season on February 18, 2012, against Thun. The following season, he was suffered from an injury, and therefore played only nineteen games.

In 2013–2014, Pedro Henrique made his first full season in Zurich, playing forty games, including two from UEFA Europa League, in which FC Zurich was eliminated by Slovan Liberec, scoring eleven goals.
He won the Coupe de Suisse, but he did not participate in the final, due to a suspension. This successful season allows him to attract the attention of many clubs. On 26 June 2014 he signed with French Ligue 1 club Rennes, a four-year contract.

On 30 January 2017, Pedro Henrique moved to PAOK for a reported fee of €1.6 million, signing a contract with the Greek club until 30 June 2020. On 5 February 2017, in his second appearance in the Superleague Greece he scored his first goal with the club, sealing a 3–2 home win against Asteras Tripoli. On 6 May 2017, the Brazilian winger (81') along with Diego Biseswar bagged the goals of Serbian manager Vladan Ivic's team, helping PAOK win 2–1 at Greek Cup final against AEK Athens at Panthessaliko Stadium of Volos and won the Greek Cup title for the 5th time in the history of the club.

On 27 July 2017, Olimpik Donetsk and PAOK played out 1–1 draw at Valeriy Lobanovskyi Dynamo Stadium, for the third qualifying round of 2017–18 UEFA Europa League as the Greek Cup winners equalized thanks to a close-range effort by Brazilian winger, who came from the bench five minutes earlier.

On 31 August 2017, Qarabağ FK signed winger Pedro Henrique Konzen Medina da Silva, on loan from Greek Cup winners PAOK until the end of 2017–18 season, with a buy out clause of €5 million. On 27 September 2017, Henrique scored in the first half, with Qarabağ's first UEFA Champions League goal, after an assist of Dino Ndlovu in a 2–1 home loss against Roma.
On 24 May 2018, Qarabağ announced that Pedro Henrique had been released by the club following expiration of his loan deal.

On 14 July 2018, Astana signed winger Pedro Henrique Konzen Medina da Silva, on loan from Greek Cup winners PAOK until the end of 2018–19 season. On 30 August 2018, Pedro Henrique was the main protagonist and the only scorer with a penalty, in a 1–0 home win game against Cypriot club APOEL helping his club to  qualify for UEFA Europa League group stage after a 2-1 aggregate win on penalties.

On 28 January 2019, PAOK confirmed the return of Brazilian forward from his loan spell at FC Astana.
On 18 February 2019, he scored his first goal with the club after his return, a minute from full-time via a deflected shot from the edge of the penalty area, who had only been on the field for eight minutes after replacing Chuba Akpom, in a hammering 5–1 away win against Apollon Smyrnis in his rally to win the title after 34 years. On 7 April 2019, he opened the score in a 3–0 home win game against Lamia.

On 9 August 2019, Pedro Henrique signed a three-year contract with Turkish club Kayserispor for a €650.000 transfer fee.

Career statistics 

1 Includes UEFA Europa League.
[a] Includes Campeonato Gaúcho.
[b] Includes Swiss Promotion League (representing FC Zürich II).
[c] Includes Championnat de France Amateur 2 (representing Stade Rennais FC II).
[d] Includes Super League Playoffs.

Honours
Zürich
 Swiss Cup: 2013–14

PAOK
 Super League Greece: 2018–19
 Greek Cup: 2016–17, 2018–19

Qarabağ
 Azerbaijan Premier League: 2017–18

Astana FC
 Kazakhstan Premier League: 2018

Sivasspor
 Turkish Cup: 2021–22

References

External links
Pedro Henrique profile at football.ch

1990 births
Living people
Brazilian footballers
Brazilian expatriate footballers
Campeonato Brasileiro Série A players
Campeonato Brasileiro Série C players
Swiss Super League players
Ligue 1 players
Super League Greece players
Azerbaijan Premier League players
Kazakhstan Premier League players
Süper Lig players
Sociedade Esportiva e Recreativa Caxias do Sul players
FC Zürich players
Stade Rennais F.C. players
PAOK FC players
Qarabağ FK players
FC Astana players
Kayserispor footballers
Sivasspor footballers
Sport Club Internacional players
Expatriate footballers in Switzerland
Expatriate footballers in France
Expatriate footballers in Greece
Expatriate footballers in Azerbaijan
Expatriate footballers in Kazakhstan
Expatriate footballers in Turkey
Association football midfielders